The following movies have been filmed in space:

 Return from Orbit, 84 minutes (only partly filmed in space), 1984, Soviet Union
 For All Mankind, 80 minutes (using NASA Apollo Program footage), 1989, United States
 Space Station 3D, 47 minutes, 2002, United States
 Apogee of Fear, 8 minutes, 2012, United States
 A Beautiful Planet, 46 minutes, 2016, United States
 The Challenge, in production, 2022, Russia
 Untitled project announced in 2020 by Doug Liman and Tom Cruise, to use SpaceX and the International Space Station
 Space Explorers: The ISS Experience, 2020, Canada

See also
 List of films featuring space stations

References

space
movies